Akabane virus is an insect-transmitted virus that causes congenital abnormalities of the central nervous systems in ruminants. The virus is found in Australia, where it is most commonly spread by biting midges of the Culicoides species.

Disease

Malformation of the joints, brain, spine and jaw are common in affected newborn animals. Abortion may also occur if damage to the fetus is severe.

Diagnosis and treatment
Viral isolation can also be attempted with immunofluorescence or PCR.

Vaccination is used to control the spread of disease. Control of the insect vectors is advisable if possible, but often difficult to implement.

Outbreaks
A European outbreak of a novel orthobunyavirus began in 2011. The virus was initially isolated near Schmallenberg in Germany, and has been informally named Schmallenberg virus. Schmallenberg virus falls in the Simbu serogroup of orthobunyaviruses, in which the aino and akabane viruses are also grouped. It is considered to be most closely related to the Sathuperi and Douglas viruses.

References

External links

Merck veterinary manual
Couch A.J. (1984) Akabane Virus. Australian Red Poll Society Newsletter 92: 22–23

Orthobunyaviruses
Bovine diseases
Sheep and goat diseases